In the Beginning is a 1947 choral work by Aaron Copland to a text from the Book of Genesis chapter 1:1 to 2:7. The 15'–20' minute long work is for mixed four-part chorus a capella and soprano or mezzo-soprano solo. The work is evocative of the Hebrew davening and shows the influence of polytonality with references to jazz and blues. In the Beginning was composed for Harvard University's Symposium on Music Criticism in May 1947. The premiere was performed by the Collegiate Chorale at the Harvard Memorial Church, Cambridge on 2 May of that year, conducted by Robert Shaw.

Recordings
Martha Lipton (mezzo-soprano) In the Beginning Leonard Bernstein Sony
Ameral Gunson (mezzo-soprano) King's College Choir of Cambridge Stephen Cleobury, EMI 1991 (reissued by Warner on Copland: Billy the Kid, Rodeo & In the Beginning Saint Louis Symphony Orchestra Leonard Slatkin)
Catherine Denley, on American Choral Music. with Barber: Agnus Dei, Bernstein: Chichester Psalms, Corydon Singers, Matthew Best Hyperion 
Sally Bruce-Payne (mezzo-soprano) on In the Beginning. with Barber: Agnus Dei. Dunedin Consort  Ben Parry  Linn  2001
Beth Mackay (mezzo-soprano) on In the Beginning Choir of Merton College, Oxford, Benjamin Nicholas & Peter Phillips Delphian
Susanne Mentzer (mezzo-soprano) on American Choral Music Volume 1 with Corigliano, Foss, Ives and Persichetti The University of Texas Chamber Singers and Chamber Orchestra, James Morrow  Naxos American Classics - 8559299
Twentieth Century Masters Volume 3 - The American School The Choir of New College Oxford, Edward Higginbottom Avie
Frances Bourne (mezzo-soprano) In the Beginning Gloucester Cathedral Choir, Andrew Nethsingha Avie
D'Anna Fortunato (mezzo-soprano) An American Collage  Bucknell University Rooke Chapel Choir,  William Payn  Albany

References

1947 compositions
Compositions by Aaron Copland